This is an alphabetical list of villages in Kanyakumari district, Tamil Nadu, India.

A-E 

 Ambankalai
 Aruvikkarai
 Atchenkulam
 Chemmanvilai
 Chemmuthal
 Chinnamuttom
 Chinnathurai
 Choozhal
 Enayam Puthenthurai

K 

 Kandanvilai
 Kappukad
 Karavilai
 Karuparai
 Kattathurai
 Keezha Sarakkalvilai
 Kesavanputhenthurai
 Kesavapuram
 Kinnikannanvilai
 Kodimunai
 Kollenvilagam
 Kombavilai
 Kottagom
 Kulasekaram
 Kumarakovil
 Kurumpanai
 Kusavankuzhi

M 

 Madathattuvilai
 Madichel
 Mangavilai
 Maravankudieruppu
 Marthal
 Marthandanthurai
 Mela Raman Puthoor
 Melpuram
 Midalam
 Moolachel
 Moovattumugam
 Muhilankudieruppu
 Muppandal
 Muttom

N-O 

 Neerody
 Nesamony Nagar
 Nettancode
 Neyyoor
 Nithiravilai
 North Sarel
 Ottalivilai

P-R 

 Padanthalumoodu
 Palliyadi
 Parakuntu
 Paramarthalingapuram
 Payanam
 Pazhavilai
 Peruvilai
 Pillayarvilai
 Puthenchanthai
 Puviyur
 Rajavoor
 Ramanathichanputhur
 Ramapuram

S-T 

 South Thamaraikulam
 Swamiyar madam
 Tamaraikulam
 Thirunanthikarai
 Thoothoor
 Thovalai

V-W 

 Vadakkanadu
 Vallan Kumaran Vilai
 Vallavilai
 Vattavilai
 Vavathurai
 Vellicode
 Virivilai
 West Neyyoor
 West Parasery

Kanyakumari district